Kaminsky is a surname with various origins. It may be derived from Czech/Slovak Kaminský, 
Feminine forms include Kaminská (Czech and Slovak), Kaminska (Polish and Ukrainian), and Kaminskaya (Belarusian and Russian). Its Lithuanian-language counterpart is Kaminskas.

People
 Adolfo Kaminsky (1925–2023), French WWII resistance fighter and document forger
 Alexander Kaminsky (1829–1897), Russian architect
 Bohdan Kaminský (pen name of Karel Bušek) (1859–1929), Czech poet and translator	
 Bronislav Vladislavovich Kaminski, (1899–1944), General-Major of Waffen-SS
 Dan Kaminsky, American computer security expert
 David Kaminsky (born 1938), Israeli basketball player
 David Daniel Kaminsky, birth name of American comic Danny Kaye (1911–1987)
 Frank Kaminsky (born 1993), American basketball player
 Graciela Kaminsky, American economist
 Grigory Kaminsky (1895–1938), Soviet politician
 Ilya Kaminsky (born 1977), Russian-American poet and professor
 James Kaminsky, American editor
 Josef Kaminský (1878–1944), Czechoslovak politician
 Laura Kaminsky (born 1956), American composer
 Max Kaminsky (1912–1961), Canadian hockey player
 Max Kaminsky (1908–1994), American musician
 Melvin Kaminsky, birth name of American comic Mel Brooks (born 1926)
 Patrik Kaminský (born 1978), Slovak footballer
 Rafael Kaminsky, birth name of Rafael Eitan (1929–2004), Israeli general
 Rob Kaminsky (born 1994), American baseball player
 Stuart M. Kaminsky (1934–2009), American mystery author
 Todd Kaminsky (born 1978), American politician, great-nephew of Mel Brooks
 Walter Kaminsky (born 1941), German chemist
 Yan Kaminsky  (born 1971), Russian-American ice hockey player

Fictional characters
 Mikhail "Misha" Kaminsky, character in the anime series Mobile Suit Gundam 0080: War in the Pocket
 Victor Kaminsky, astronaut in 2001 A Space Odyssey
 Fedyor Kaminsky, character in the book series Shadow and Bone

See also
 

Czech-language surnames
Slovak-language surnames
Russian-language surnames
Ukrainian-language surnames